Ernest Race (1913-1964) was an English textile and furniture designer, born in Newcastle-upon-Tyne in 1913, and died in 1964 in London. His best-known designs are the BA3 aluminium chair of 1945 and the Antelope, designed for the Festival of Britain in 1951. The BA3 won a gold medal at the 10th Milan Trienale in 1954, where the Antelope also won a silver medal. He was made a Royal Designer for Industry in 1953.

References

External links 
Ernest Race - exclusive collection of reclaimed work by Ernest Race exclusively produced by Race Furniture
Race Stacking Chairs - Stacking Chairs based exclusively on Ernest Race's designs.

1913 births
1964 deaths
People from Newcastle upon Tyne
British textile designers
English furniture designers